Inbound aircraft to London Heathrow Airport typically follow one of a number of Standard Arrival Routes (STARs).  The STARs each terminate at one of four different RNAV waypoints (co-located with VOR navigational aids), and these also define four "stacks" where aircraft can be held, if necessary, until they are cleared to begin their approach to land.  Stacks are sections of airspace where inbound aircraft will normally use the pattern closest to their arrival route. They can be visualised as invisible helter skelters in the sky. Each stack descends in 1000 ft (300 m) intervals from 16,000 ft (4,000m) down to 8000 ft (2,100m). If these holds become full, aircraft are held at more distant points before being cleared onward to one of the four main holds.

The stacks

Bovingdon
The Bovingdon stack (BNN) is for arrivals from the north west. It extends above the village of Bovingdon and the town of Chesham, and uses the RNAV waypoint BNN (co-located with the BNN VOR), which is situated on the former RAF Bovingdon airfield.

Biggin Hill
The Biggin Hill stack (BIG) on the south east edge of Greater London is for arrivals from the south east.  It uses the RNAV waypoint BIG (co-located with the BIG VOR), which is situated on London Biggin Hill Airport.

Lambourne
The Lambourne stack (LAM) in Essex is for arrivals from the north east.  It uses the RNAV waypoint LAM (co-located with the LAM VOR), which is situated adjacent to Stapleford Aerodrome.

Ockham

The Ockham stack (OCK) in Surrey is for arrivals from the south west.  It uses the RNAV waypoint OCK (co-located with the OCK VOR), which is situated on the former Wisley Airfield. During typical easterly operations, the proximity of arrival traffic via OCK requires departures from Heathrow's runway 09R towards the Compton VOR (CPT) to follow a non-standard departure procedure.

Developments
The arrival procedures are being revised since 2014 to reduce stacking by introducing variable speed limits and alternative holding procedures.

Incidents
On 1 December 2003 at 6am, a major disaster in the stack was narrowly avoided.  An air traffic controller was blamed by a later inquiry for misdirecting traffic when he ordered a United Airlines Boeing 777 into a level of the Bovingdon Hold (or stack) already occupied by a similar British Airways plane. The two planes, carrying 500 passengers, flew within 600 vertical feet (180 m) of each other.

References

Further reading
 Howell, G. (1976). Future system consideration for operations of aircraft in the terminal movement area. The Aeronautical Journal, 80(782), 51-60. doi:10.1017/S0001924000033480

External links

London 24 - Layers of London air traffic, NATS, 2014

Aviation in London
Aviation in England
Heathrow Airport